Boris Ekmeščić (born 10 November 1964) is a Croatian retired footballer who played as a forward. He later worked as a manager.

References

External links
 

1964 births
Living people
Association football forwards
Yugoslav footballers
Croatian footballers
NK Zagreb players
HNK Rijeka players
Grazer AK players
1. FC Union Berlin players
VfB Oldenburg players
FC Gütersloh 2000 players
Rot Weiss Ahlen players
BV Cloppenburg players
Yugoslav First League players
2. Liga (Austria) players
2. Bundesliga players
Croatian expatriate footballers
Expatriate footballers in Austria
Croatian expatriate sportspeople in Austria
Expatriate footballers in Germany
Croatian expatriate sportspeople in Germany
Croatian football managers
SV Wilhelmshaven managers
Croatian expatriate football managers
Expatriate football managers in Germany